Bennie Bernard Williams (born July 18, 1972) is a former American and Canadian football offensive tackle.  Williams was the Philadelphia Eagles' first round draft pick in the 1994 NFL Draft and started all 16 games for the Eagles in 1994. He was named to the NFL's All-Rookie team that season.

Williams tested positive for marijuana several times, and he never played in the NFL after his rookie season.  After his rookie season, Williams was suspended from the NFL and never applied for reinstatement.

He would later play for the XFL's Memphis Maniax, the AFL's Detroit Fury and the CFL's BC Lions and Toronto Argonauts.

References

External links
Toronto Argonauts profile (from Internet Archive)
FootballDB.com stats
DatabaseFootball.com stats

1972 births
Living people
African-American players of American football
American football offensive tackles
BC Lions players
Canadian football offensive linemen
Detroit Fury players
Georgia Bulldogs football players
Memphis Maniax players
Philadelphia Eagles players
Toronto Argonauts players
Players of American football from Memphis, Tennessee
Players of Canadian football from Memphis, Tennessee
21st-century African-American sportspeople
20th-century African-American sportspeople